Borderless may refer to:

 Borderless (Cameron Cartio album), 2006
 Borderless (Rihwa album), 2014
 Borderless Magazine, a non-profit online magazine based in Chicago
 "Borderless", a 1990 song by Shirley Kwan
 Borderless: A Docu-Drama About the Lives of Undocumented Workers, a 2006 documentary by Dionne Brand
 Borderless, a 2009 film by Brooke Hanson awarded at Naperville Independent Film Festival
 Borderless, a 2019 documentary by Lauren Southern
 Borderless, a 2010 gospel reggae album by Sherwin Gardner
 borderless, a docu-series hosted by Stephan Said

See also
 
 Without Borders, a 2015 Russian comedy film